Joan & Melissa: Joan Knows Best? is an American reality television series that was broadcast from January 25, 2011 to May 4, 2014, four seasons, on WE tv It chronicled the lives of Joan and Melissa Rivers as they worked on their careers, took care of their family, and balanced their social lives with their work lives. The series concluded four months before Joan Rivers died.

Episodes

Season 1 (2011)

Season 2 (2012)

Season 3 (2013)

Season 4 (2014)

Broadcast
The series premiered on September 4, 2011 on E!.

References

2010s American reality television series
2011 American television series debuts
2014 American television series endings
English-language television shows
Joan Rivers